Native Language Music is a jazz record label founded in 1996 by Theo Bishop and Joe Sherbanee in southern California.

Roster
 Theo Bishop
 Erin Bode
 East West Quintet
 Four80East
 Sara Gazarek
 Tony Guerrero
 Warren Hill
 Jeff Kashiwa
 Josh Nelson
 Adam Niewood
 Gerry Niewood
 Dan Siegel
 Andy Snitzer
 Turning Point

See also
 List of record labels

References

External links
 Official website

Record labels established in 1996
American independent record labels
Jazz record labels
Companies based in California
1996 establishments in California